Wilhelm Grunwald (15 July 1909 – 7 June 1989) was a German mathematician who introduced the Grunwald–Wang theorem, though his original statement and proof of this contained a small error that was corrected by Shianghao Wang. He later left mathematics to become a science librarian, and was director of the Göttingen university library .

References

1909 births
1989 deaths
20th-century German mathematicians